Bashevskaya is a rural locality (a village) in Spasskoye Rural Settlement, Tarnogsky District, Vologda Oblast, Russia. The population was 50 as of 2002.

Geography 
Bashevskaya is located 31 km northwest of Tarnogsky Gorodok (the district's administrative centre) by road. Nikiforovskaya is the nearest rural locality.

References 

Rural localities in Tarnogsky District